The Omaha Mammoths were a professional football team based in Omaha, Nebraska.  They were a charter member of the Fall Experimental Football League, which was trying to become the developmental league for the National Football League.  They played their home games at TD Ameritrade Park in Omaha, home of the College World Series and the former home of the United Football League's Omaha Nighthawks.  The Mammoths were the first pro outdoor football franchise to play in Omaha since the Nighthawks.

Despite having the strongest attendance in the FXFL for 2014 and a promise from the commissioner that the team would return, the Mammoths were quietly replaced by the Hudson Valley Fort during the 2015 offseason due to travel costs. Mammoths coach Sandy Buda confirmed the report on July 19. The Mammoths finished their first and only season in second place with a record of 3–1, declining to play a championship game.

Final roster

References

External links

 Official website
 Official Facebook page
 Official Twitter page

 
2014 establishments in Nebraska
2015 disestablishments in Nebraska